The Nauran ambassador in Taipei is the official representative of the Government in the Yaren District to the Government of Taiwan.

List of representatives

References 

Nauru
Taiwan
Nauru